Siobhan Claire Byrne (born August 13, 1984) is a German-born Irish sabre fencer. She is a four-time All-American (2005–2008), a three-time Academic All-Big Ten honoree, and a two-time medalist at the Junior World Cup Fencing Series. She also won a bronze medal for her category at the 2007 Junior European Championships in Conegliano, Italy, and was ranked as the no. 1 Irish fencer.

Byrne represented Ireland at the 2008 Summer Olympics where she competed in the women's individual sabre event. She lost the first preliminary round match to Poland's Irena Więckowska, with a score of 8–15.

Byrne is also a member of the fencing team for the Ohio State Buckeyes (under her coach Vladimir Nazlymov), and a summa cum laude graduate, with a degree in health information management and systems, at the Ohio State University in Columbus, Ohio.

References

External links
Profile – FIE
Profile – Ohio State Buckeyes
NBC 2008 Olympics profile

Irish female sabre fencers
Living people
Olympic fencers of Ireland
Fencers at the 2008 Summer Olympics
Irish people of German descent
People from Ostfildern
Sportspeople from Stuttgart (region)
Ohio State University College of Medicine alumni
Ohio State Buckeyes fencers
1984 births